The following is the discography of Italian rapper Emis Killa.

Studio albums

Mixtapes

Extended plays

Singles

References 

Hip hop discographies
Discographies of Italian artists